The Café was a New Zealand morning television lifestyle show that was first aired on 11 April 2016. The series finished at the end of 2020.

The program was hosted by Mel Homer and Carly Flynn. Mike Puru co-hosted the show from 2016 until May 2020.

References

Further reading

External links 
  [Now a defunct website]

2016 New Zealand television series debuts
2020 New Zealand television series endings
2010s New Zealand television series
2020s New Zealand television series
English-language television shows
New Zealand television talk shows
Three (TV channel) original programming
Breakfast television in New Zealand